Sunshine Dad is a 1916 American silent comedy film produced by Fine Arts Film Company and distributed by Triangle Film Corporation. It was directed by Edward Dillon, written by Tod Browning and 'Chet' Withey and starred stage comedian DeWolf Hopper. Hopper's year old son, William Hopper, appears in the film as a baby.

The film is also known as A Knight of the Garter.

A print is preserved at the Library of Congress.

Cast
DeWolf Hopper - Alfred Evergreen
Fay Tincher - Widow Marrimore
Chester Withey - Count Kottschkoiff
Max Davidson - Mystic Seer
Raymond Wells - Mystic Doer
Eugene Pallette - Fred Evergreen
Jewel Carmen - Charlotte
William Hopper - Baby
Leo - A Lion

References

External links

allmovie/synopsis; Sunshine Dad

1916 films
American silent feature films
Films directed by Edward Dillon
1916 comedy films
Silent American comedy films
American black-and-white films
1910s American films